Geçit can refer to:

 Geçit, Erzincan
 Geçit, Gercüş